Bromine dioxide is the chemical compound composed of bromine and oxygen with the formula BrO2. It forms unstable yellow to yellow-orange crystals. It was first isolated by R. Schwarz and M. Schmeißer in 1937 and is hypothesized to be important in the atmospheric reaction of bromine with ozone.
It is similar to chlorine dioxide, the dioxide of its halogen neighbor one period higher on the periodic table.

Reactions
Bromine dioxide is formed when an electric current is passed through a mixture of bromine and oxygen gases at low temperature and pressure.

Bromine dioxide can also be formed by the treatment of bromine gas with ozone in trichlorofluoromethane at −50 °C.

When mixed with a base, bromine dioxide gives the bromide and bromate anions:
6 BrO2 + 6 NaOH → NaBr + 5 NaBrO3 + 3 H2O

References

Bromine compounds
Oxides
Substances discovered in the 1930s